The Croatian War of Independence was fought from 1991 to 1995 between Croat forces loyal to the government of Croatia—which had declared independence from the Socialist Federal Republic of Yugoslavia (SFRY)—and the Serb-controlled Yugoslav People's Army (JNA) and local Serb forces, with the JNA ending its combat operations in Croatia by 1992.

1989
 9 July 1989
 The Anti-bureaucratic revolution, political rallies of Serbs in SR Croatia, marked by Greater Serbian rhetoric

1990
 25 July 1990
 Newly elected Croatian Parliament changes constitution of the Socialist Republic of Croatia, amending its name, symbols and its top leadership, embarking on a path of independence of Croatia
 17 August 1990
 Log Revolution
 October 1990
 SAO Kninska Krajina proclaims autonomy
 21 December 1990
 SAO Krajina proclaims autonomy
 22 December 1990
 Christmas Constitution

1991

 1–3 March 1991
 Pakrac clash
 31 March 1991
 Plitvice Lakes incident
 March–April 1991
 SAO Krajina proclaims itself to be separate from Croatia and seeks unification with Serbia
 29 April 1991
 Blockade of Kijevo begins.
 2 May 1991
 Borovo Selo killings
 6 May 1991
 Protest against Yugoslav People's Army in Split
 25 June 1991
 Slovenia and Croatia declare their independence
 7 July 1991
 Croatian independence suspended for three months through Brioni Agreement
 26–27 July 1991
 Operation Stinger
 1 August 1991
 Dalj killings
 17 August 1991
 Kijevo besieged again.
 25 August 1991
 Battle of Vukovar begins
 29 August - 22 September 1991
 Battle of Gospić
 3–4 September 1991
 Battle of Kusonje
 14 September 1991
 Start of the Battle of the barracks
 16–22 September 1991
 Battle of Šibenik
 16 September – 5 October 1991
 Battle of Zadar
 22 September 1991
 Capture of Varaždin Barracks
 29 September 1991
 Capture of Bjelovar Barracks
 1 October 1991
 Start of the Siege of Dubrovnik
 4 October 1991
 Dalj massacre
 Bombing of the Zagreb TV Tower
 5 October 1991
 Croatia commences general mobilization
 7 October 1991
 Bombing of Banski dvori
 10 October 1991
 Lovas massacre
 10–13 October 1991
 Široka Kula massacre
 16–18 October 1991
 Gospić massacre
 20 October 1991
 Baćin massacre
 28 October 1991
 Massacre in Lipovača near Saborsko
 29 October 1991 – 3 January 1992
 Operation Hurricane-91
 31 October 1991 – 4 November 1991
 Operation Swath-10
 7 November 1991
 Massacre in Vukovići near Saborsko
 10–12 November 1991
 Battle of Bastajski Brđani
 10 November 1991
 Pula Airport incident
 12 November 1991
 Massacre in Saborsko
 14 November 1991
 Battle of the Dalmatian channels
 18 November 1991
 Battle of Vukovar ends, Vukovar massacre
 18 November 1991
 Škabrnja massacre
 23 November 1991
 Vance plan - Geneva Accord signed
 28 November – 26 December 1991
 Operation Papuk-91
 7 December 1991
 Murder of the Zec family
 11–13 December 1991
 Operation Whirlwind
 13 December 1991
 Voćin massacre
 16 December 1991
 Joševica massacre
 17–18 December 1991
 Operation Devil's Beam
 21 December 1991
 Bruška massacre
 21 December 1991
 Vrsar Bombing

1992

 7 January 1992
 1992 European Community Monitor Mission helicopter downing
 15 January 1992
 24 countries, including 12 members of the European Communities, officially recognize Croatia as an independent state.
 3 April 1992
 Operation Baranja
 30 May 1992
 UN imposes sanctions against FR Yugoslavia
 17–22 May
 Operation Jaguar
 7 June 1992 – 26 June 1992
 Operation Jackal (also known as Operation June Dawns)
 21–23 June 1992
 Miljevci plateau battle
 1 July 1991 – 13 July 1992
 Operation Tiger
 23 July 1992 – 8 August 1992
 Operation Liberated Land
 22 September 1992
 FR Yugoslavia ousted from the UN
 20–23 October 1992
 Battle of Konavle
 22 October 1991 – 1 November 1992
 Operation Vlaštica

1993

 22 January 1993
 Operation Maslenica
 18 February 1993
 Daruvar Agreement
 9–17 September 1993
 Operation Medak Pocket

1994

 March 1994
 Washington Agreement
 1–3 November 1994
 Operation Cincar
 29 November – 24 December 1994
 Operation Winter '94

1995

 January 1995
 Creation of Z-4 plan
 7 April 1995
 Operation Leap 1
 1–3 May 1995
 Operation Flash
 2–3 May 1995
 Zagreb rocket attack
 4–10 June 1995
 Operation Leap 2
 4–7 August 1995
 Operation Storm
 12 November 1995
 Signing of Erdut agreement
 November & December 1995
 The Dayton Agreement

See also
 Timeline of the breakup of Yugoslavia
 Timeline of the Yugoslav Wars

References

External links
Chronology of the homeland war at the web site of the Armed Forces of the Republic of Croatia

Croatian War of Independence
Croatian War Of Independence